Lake Kolvitskoye is a large freshwater lake on the Kola Peninsula, Murmansk Oblast, Russia. It has an area of 121 km² and a maximum depth of 20 m. The Kolvitsa flows from the lake.

External links
 

Lakes of Murmansk Oblast
Kolvitsa basin
Kandalakshsky District